This rather technical article provides a typological sketch of the Miskito language. Another related article outlines Miskito grammar in fuller detail. The distinctive purpose of the present article is to single out those specific features of Miskito linguistic structure that are relevant to this language's general typological classification and characterization, answering the question: What major features make this language similar to or different from other languages? This article is likely to be of most interest and use to readers interested in general linguistics, language typology, and related areas such as areal typology, and especially (though not exclusively) to professional linguists. Another possible use of this article is as a thumbnail sketch of the language, a checklist of its most salient points, serving as a brief guide to the fuller language description in the Miskito grammar article.

Phonology

Phoneme inventory
The Miskito phoneme inventory includes four vowels (a, e, i, o, u), apparently with phonemic length playing a part. Consonant series include voiced and voiceless plosives, voiced nasals and semivowels, two liquids and the fricative s. Orthographic h apparently represents a suprasegmental feature.

Other aspects
Syllables consist of a vowel nucleus preceded and followed by a maximum of two consonant: (C)(C)V(C)(C). Word stress is normally on the first syllable and not distinctive.

Morphology
Inflectional and derivational morphology are of moderate complexity and predominantly suffixing, together with the use of infixes in the nominal paradigm.

Nominal morphology
The nominal morphological categories are ligature and person (but not number) of the possessor, the exponents of which have suffix and infix allophones, except for third person and first person inclusive possessor indices, which are preposed particles. Plural number is indicated by a postpositive particle.

Verbal morphology
In the verbal morphology, tense, mood and person (of the subject) are marked by suffixes (and sometimes fused into portmanteau suffix forms). Object indices of transitive verbs are represented by particles preceding the verb (third person is zero). Number is not marked in these subject and object indices, but a plural subject may be indicated through a verbal periphrasis serving this function.

Syntax

Word order

Sentence order is predominantly SOV. Auxiliaries follow main verbs. Sentence particles are sentence-final. Within the noun phrase, most determiners precede the head, but articles follow it, as do quantifiers. Adjectives may either precede or follow the head noun. Possessors precede possessed, and relative clauses precede their head. The ligature morpheme generally occurs on the noun whenever this is preceded by one of the items mentioned, and also when it takes a possessive index. Postpositional structures are found.

Head or dependent marking

Miskito is consistently head-marking. There is pro-drop for both subject and object (i.e. subject and object pronouns are commonly omitted). The finite verb's subject argument is indexed for person (not for number) on the verb. Transitive verbs also index their object through pre-verbal particles (zero for third person). A maximum of one such object index is possible. If a transitive verb has both a patient and a recipient, the latter is not indexed and appears as a postpositional phrase (indirect object).

The expression of nominal possessive or genitive relations is similarly head-marking: the head (i.e. the possessed) is marked with indices indicating the person of the dependent (the possessor), the noun phrase expressing which is either omitted normally if pronominal (a pro-drop phenomenon) or precedes the head, e.g. arask-i 'my horse' (or yang arask-i), araska 'his horse' (zero-marked possessor), Juan araska 'Juan's horse' (cf. aras 'horse' without ligature).

Adpositions
Other relations between a verb and its noun phrase complements or adjuncts are expressed by means of postpositional structures or relational constructions. Postpositions are invariable and follow the noun phrase, e.g. Nicaragua ra 'in/to Nicaragua'. A relational construction has the internal form of a possessive construction (above), except that the place of the head noun is occupied by a quasi-noun called a relational; the latter is often followed by a postpositon. E.g. nin-i-ra (or yang ninira) 'behind me', nina-ra (or witin ninara) 'behind him', Juan nina-ra 'behind Juan', where the relational nina imitates a possessed noun.

Predication, sentence types and compound and complex sentences
There is a copula with an irregular and defective conjugational paradigm.

Negation is achieved through various constructions. One is the use of the verb's negative participle, which is invariable for person and tense; another is through use of a negative particle apia which follows verbs (in the future only), but precedes the copula. Yes-no questions have no special grammatical marking as such, but all kinds of questions are optionally followed by the sentence particle ki. Other sentence particles express different modal nuances.

Verbs or whole clauses may be conjoined by juxtaposition, all but the last verb in the chain adopting the form of a switch reference participle. These vary in form depending on whether the following verb has the same or a different subject, and also depending on certain tense or aspect relations, and on the person of the subject in the case of different-subject participles.

Besides these widely used constructions, clauses may also be linked by coordinating conjunctions, and subordinate clauses may be marked by a clause-final subordinator.

See also
Miskito grammar
Miskito language

Bibliography
 Salamanca, Danilo (no date). Gramática escolar del Miskito/Manual de Gramática del Miskito. Draft version formerly on the Internet.

Language typology
Linguistic typology
Misumalpan languages
Indigenous languages of Central America